Hero is the debut studio album by American country music singer Maren Morris, released on June 3, 2016, through Columbia Nashville. It marks Morris' first release on a major label and her fourth overall. The album debuted and peaked at number five on the Billboard 200 chart and was nominated for Best Country Album at the 59th Annual Grammy Awards.

Background
In August 2015, Morris self-released five songs as a self-titled extended play, Maren Morris, on Spotify. The songs garnered 2.5 million streams on Spotify in a month, with three songs appearing in Spotify's US and Global "Viral 50" chart. The success of Morris' EP attracted the interest of major labels and she eventually signed to Columbia Nashville in September 2015. The label then re-released the 5-song EP on November 6, 2015, with "My Church" as the lead single.

"My Church" would become a success on the chart, reaching number 5 on the Hot Country Songs chart. The success of "My Church" was followed by the release of the Morris' first major label album release, Hero. All tracks from the EP are included on the album, with "Company You Keep" included on the deluxe edition. The additional songs in the album were co-written with Chris DeStefano, Natalie Hemby, Shane McAnally, and others. Morris has writing credits on all the songs in the album.

Release and promotion
The album's lead single, "My Church", was released on January 19, 2016. The album's second single, "80s Mercedes", was released to country radio on June 27, 2016. The album's third single, "I Could Use a Love Song" was released to country radio on March 27, 2017. "Rich" was released February 12, 2018, as the album's fourth single.

Morris embarked on the Hero Tour in 2017, in support of her album.

A deluxe edition of the album was released on March 17, 2017. It features the songs "Bummin' Cigarettes", "Space" and "Company You Keep".

Critical reception

Hero was well received by most music critics. Stephen Thomas Erlewine of AllMusic praised Morris' inventiveness and how she "skillfully slides between styles, blurring distinctions between genre and eras". Erlewine felt that the album "belongs to the digital era but it's the songs – smart, sharp, and hooky – that make this a great modern pop album, regardless of genre." Jon Caramanica of The New York Times considered the album an outstanding country music debut, and "perhaps the canniest country record in recent memory." Caramanica thought Morris an "astute synthesizer" of various styles, and found the album to be "both utterly of its moment and also savvy enough to indicate how the future might sound." He also noted the profanity in some of the songs that Morris used "fluently, casually, and effectively, which is to say, you hardly notice at all as she's breaking what may be country's last remaining taboo." Sounds Like Nashville referred to Morris' songwriting talent, powerful vocals and eclectic music style that made Hero one of the most unique and enjoyable releases of 2016.

Accolades

Commercial performance
In the United States, Hero debuted at number five on the Billboard 200 chart with 45,000 equivalent album units; the album sold 37,000 copies in pure sales, with the remainder of its unit total reflecting the album's streaming and track equivalent album units. It also debuted at number one on the Top Country Albums chart. As of April 2019, the album has sold 313,100 copies in the United States. On July 17, 2019, the album was certified platinum by the Recording Industry Association of America (RIAA) for combined sales and album-equivalent units of over a million units.

Track listing

Notes
"Second Wind" was originally recorded by Kelly Clarkson and included on the deluxe edition of her 2015 album, Piece by Piece.

Personnel
Credits adapted from liner notes.

Musicians

 Rich Brinsfield – bass guitar
 busbee – percussion, programming, bass guitar, keyboards, piano, Hammond B-3 organ, Wurlitzer, synthesizer, acoustic guitar, electric guitar
 Eric Darken – percussion
 Johnny Duke – electric guitar
 Fred Eltringham – drums
 Ian Fitchuk – drums, programming, bass guitar, keyboards, piano, Hammond B-3 organ, Wurlitzer, acoustic guitar, whistling, background vocals
 Joe Fox – electric guitar
 Natalie Hemby – background vocals
 Brad Hill – programming, crowd noise, background vocals
 Ryan Hurd – background vocals
 Mason Levy – programming
 Hayley McLean – electric guitar
 Carl Miner – acoustic guitar, banjo, bouzouki
 Heather Morgan – background vocals
 Maren Morris – lead vocals, background vocals
 John Osborne – electric guitar
 Aaron Sterling – drums, percussion
 Dave Thomson – background vocals
 Mark Trussell – electric guitar
 Brett Tyler – programming, bass guitar, keyboards, electric guitar, background vocals
 Laura Veltz – background vocals
 Derek Wells – acoustic guitar, electric guitar, mandolin

Choir singers 
 The McCrary Sisters (Regina McCrary, Deborah McCrary, Alfreda McCrary, Allen McCrary, Beverly McCrary)

Technical

 Austin Atwood – digital editing
 Adam Ayan – mastering
 Jeff Balding – recording, engineer
 busbee – producer (all tracks except 9, 12, 14), recording, mixing
 Dave Clauss – recording, mixing
 Eric Darken – recording
 Zach DeWall – assistant engineer
 Ian Fitchuk – producer (track 12), recording
 Kenley Flynn – production assistant (track 14 only)
 Brad Hill – production (tracks 6, 9, 13), recording
 Scott Johnson – production assistant
 Jordan Lehning – digital editing
 Amanda Miller – assistant engineer
 Maren Morris – producer
 Ernesto Olivera – assistant, drum recording assistant
 Juan Sevilla – assistant engineer
 Aaron Sterling – recording
 Morgan Stratton – drum recording assistant
 Brett Tyler – producer (track 14), recording
 Derek Wells – recording
 Brian David Willis – digital editing

Charts

Weekly charts

Year-end charts

Certifications

References

2016 debut albums
Maren Morris albums
Columbia Records albums
Albums produced by busbee